is a Japanese computer engineer. Watanabe is the project manager of the RIKEN Next-Generation Supercomputer R&D Center. He played a central role in the development of the NEC SX architecture. Watanabe was awarded the Eckert–Mauchly Award in 1998, and the Seymour Cray Computer Engineering Award in 2006.

External links
 Short RIKEN biography
 NEC press release following his award of the Cray award

Living people
Seymour Cray Computer Engineering Award recipients
Riken personnel
NEC people
Year of birth missing (living people)